Esk Valley Railway may refer to

Esk Valley Railway (Scotland), former Scottish railway company
Esk Valley Railway (North Yorkshire), railway line in the Esk Valley, North Yorkshire